Arakel Grigori Babakhanian (– 14 November 1932), commonly known by his pen name Leo, was an Armenian historian, writer, critic and professor of Yerevan State University. He is best known for authoring a multi-volume work on the history of Armenia. Leo adopted a critical stance in examining some of the most important issues in Armenian history, literature and contemporary problems of the early 20th century.

Biography
Leo was born on 14 April 1860 in the city of Shusha/Shushi in the region of Mountainous Karabakh, then a part of the Russian Empire. He was one of several children of Grigor Babakhanian, a tailor (later bellringer) of modest means. He graduated from the local school there in 1878. Due to the death of his father in 1879, Leo was unable to attend university and began working to support his family. He took up several jobs in Shusha and Baku as a notary clerk, telegraph operator, and the manager of a publishing press called Aror ("Plough"). From 1895 to 1906, Leo worked as a journalist and secretary in Tiflis for the influential Armenian-language newspaper Mshak ("Tiller"). Leo would later become the editor of Mshak in 1918. In 1906, he began teaching at the Gevorgian Theological Seminary at Ejmiatsin, although he returned to Tiflis a year later, dedicating himself to academic work.

Many of his works have been published in the Armenian newspaper of Constantinople as well as in Sourp Ghazar. 

Politically, Leo was opposed to the policies of the Armenian Dashnaktsutyun political party and was a member of the Populist (Zhoghovrdakan) Party, joining it in 1917. Other prominent positions Leo held include being an adviser to the delegation of the Seim of the Transcaucasian Democratic Federative Republic, which held negotiations with the Ottomans in Trabzon in March 1918, and the president of the Karabakh Armenian Patriotic Association from 1918 to 1920.

Academic career

Leo never received a higher education and his knowledge and erudition was almost entirely self-taught. He had welcomed the sovietization of Armenia in 1920 and offered his services to the newly established state. Though he had lectured there during the fall term of 1919, it was only in 1924 that he was formally offered a position of professor at Yerevan State University in the field of Armenian studies. He already had worked for numerous publishing houses and published several books on Armenian history but his three-volume work, History of Armenia (Patmut'yun Hayots', vol. 1 originally published in Tiflis, 1917; vols. 2 and 3, Yerevan, 1946–1947; republished in 1966–73), is the most noteworthy. After Soviet Russian writer Andrei Bitov visited Yerevan in 1960, he remarked that "he did not enter any house which did not have the familiar three volumes of Leo's History of Armenia." His work traces Armenian history from its beginnings until the end of the nineteenth century, with the exception of the period stretching from the eleventh to the fifteenth centuries (the third volume begins with the sixteenth century, whereas the second volume had ended in the eleventh). It devotes particular importance to the political, cultural and social issues that surrounded Armenian life and the role that Armenia's neighbors played in the country's history.

References

Notes

Citations

Further reading
 Ohanian, A. K. Leoyi gegharvestakan steghtsagortsutʻyune [Leo's artistic output]. Yerevan: Armenian Academy of Sciences, 1969.
 Leo. Tʻiwrkʻahay heghapʻokhutʻean gaghapʻarabanutʻiwne [The ideology of the Turkish Armenian revolution], 2 vols. Paris: Tpagr. Pahri Eghbarts, 1934–1935.
 Leo. Yerkeri zhoghovatsu [Collected Works]. 10 volumes. Yerevan: Hayastan Publishing, 1966–1973.

External links

Leo in The Great Soviet Encyclopedia

1860 births
1932 deaths
Writers from Shusha
19th-century Armenian historians
Academic staff of Yerevan State University
Armenian people from the Russian Empire
Soviet Armenians
20th-century Armenian historians